The Manila City Jail, popularly known as Old Bilibid Prison, is a detention center in Manila, Philippines. The jail is one of the most overcrowded in the world.

History

19th and 20th centuries 
The old prison was established by the Spanish colonial government on June 25, 1865, via royal decree. The Commonwealth of the Philippines enacted Commonwealth Act No. 67 on October 23, 1936, which allocated 1million Philippine pesos to build a new prison in Muntinlupa on 551 hectares (1,360 acres) of land in an area that was considered at that time to be remote. Construction began the same year. In 1940, the prisoners, equipment and facilities were transferred from Old Bilibid to the new prison, which was officially named the New Bilibid Prison. The remnants of the old facility became the Manila City Jail.

Present day 
The Manila City Jail began overcrowding at the start of the Rodrigo Duterte administration, during the crack down on drug-related crimes.

In September 2019, two inmates were killed and 32 were injured in a riot that began with an argument between two members of rival gangs over a sleeping space. At the time, the dormitory in the facility where the fight broke out was housing 800 inmates despite having a 200-person capacity.

As the COVID-19 pandemic began to spread in 2020, a spokesperson for the Manila City Jail told ABS-CBN News that the jail was housing more than four times its intended capacity, with 4,800 inmates in the facility. The jail began to allow inmates to stay in open spaces within the jail compound to increase physical distancing. Family visits were disallowed, and the jail added ten computers to allow for visits via video chat. Jail employees were put under lockdown and not allowed to return home beginning March 20, 2020. An old building previously used to quarantine tuberculosis patients was established as an isolation location for potential COVID-19 patients. The jail spokesperson told ABS-CBN that "As of now, Manila City Jail remains COVID-19 free"; however, ABS-CBN noted that no one at the facility had been tested. In April 2020, the international non-governmental organisation Human Rights Watch expressed the concern that, due to incomplete reporting by the Philippine government, COVID-19 might be spreading more quickly and widely within Philippine detention centers than it appeared.

Facility 

The  Manila City Jail has the capacity to house 1,100 inmates.

Operating at an average of 463.6% occupancy, detention centers in the Philippines are the second most overcrowded in the world. , there were 4,800 inmates in the Manila City Jail. In December 2018, the Philippines topped the list of countries with the most overcrowded prisons, with the average facility population exceeding 600% capacity. At that time, the Manila City Jail was housing 6,300 inmates, 90% of whom were pretrial detainees. Also as of December 2018, the ratio of guards to inmates was 1:200, considerably higher than international guidelines which recommend a ratio of 1:7. In January 2019, The New York Times reported that during one shift the ratio was 1:528.

Due to overcrowding, inmates sleep in shifts. Many sleep side by side on all available floor space and stairways, including in hallways and bathrooms. Some do not have room to lay down and must sleep sitting up. Those who can afford it pay other inmates, who act as dorm leaders, to allow them to sleep in  cubicles called .

Although gangs are forbidden, officials allow them to operate because they help maintain order. A spokesman for the Manila City Jail told The New York Times in 2019, "Formally, we don't allow inmates to police other inmates. Informally, we do because of a lack of resources." The gangs self-enforce rules such as those forbidding fighting and approaching other inmates' visitors. They also maintain communal funds and help distribute food, which is scarce within the facility.

Human rights concerns 
Leah Armamento, a member of the Philippine government's Commission on Human Rights, has said that the overcrowding in Philippine jails constitutes torture according to the United Nations Subcommittee on Prevention of Torture.

The international NGO Human Rights Watch raised concerns in April 2020 that COVID-19 was spreading more quickly and widely in Philippine detention centers than reporting suggested, and urged authorities to investigate the causes of deaths in the facilities, reduce prison populations, and implement other measures to prevent the spread of the virus. Amnesty International raised concerns the same month over the risk of Philippine prisons and detention facilities to become hot-spots of the COVID-19 pandemic. Amnesty urged authorities to release prisoners, saying their health is at immediate risk due to the lack of space, food, water, hygiene and health care. The massive overcrowding is partially due fact that roughly 75% of the detainees are pre-trial or remand prisoners. Many of them are being held without a trial for years, sometimes for minor offences.

References 

Prisons in the Philippines
Buildings and structures in Santa Cruz, Manila
History of Manila